Eravathur is a small village situated towards the south end of Thrissur district of Kerala state in India.

Transport 
The nearest railway stations are Chalakudy and Angamaly.

The nearest bus stations are at Chalakudy, Mala, and Aluwaye.

The nearest airport is Cochin International Airport.

Temples & Churches
 Thalayakkulam Bhagavathy Kshethram
 Purappillikkavu Bhagavathy Kshethram
 Mary Immaculate Church Kuzhur
 Mary Immaculate Church Eravathoor

Schools 

 Eravathur SKVLP School

Nearby schools 

 Govt. Schools Kuzhur.
 S.N.D.P HSS Palissery School

Nearby villages 

 Kuzhur
 ValiyaParambu
 Poovathussery
 KochuKadavu
 Kurumassery

References 

Villages in Thrissur district